Cold Hands, Warm Heart is a young adult novel by Jill Wolfson. It was first published in 2009 by Henry Holt and Company. This is Jill Wolfson's latest novel and it addresses subjects like life-threatening illness, loss, and the gift of life through organ donation.

Synopsis

Fifteen-year-old Dani was born with her heart on the wrong side of her body, a condition called dextrocardia.  Fourteen-year-old Amanda puts her heart and soul into competitive gymnastics. One girl lives a life of x-rays, tests, and endless hospital visits while the other is on the fast-track to the national championship. During a brilliant gymnastic routine, Amanda slips and a young life with so much potential comes to an end.  With Amanda's death, Dani, in desperate need of a heart transplant, gets a second chance.

References

2009 American novels
American young adult novels
Henry Holt and Company books